is a passenger railway station located in Midori-ku in the city of Sagamihara, Kanagawa Prefecture, Japan, and is operated by the East Japan Railway Company (JR East).

Lines

Station layout
The station consists of a single island platform and a side platform serving three tracks, connected to the station building by a footbridge. The middle platform (Platform 2) is used only for through traffic. The station is staffed.

Platforms

Station history
The JGR became the JNR after the end of World War II. The station was renamed to its present name on April 10, 1956. Regularly scheduled freight services were discontinued in 1971. With the dissolution and privatization of the JNR on April 1, 1987, the station came under the control of the East Japan Railway Company. Automated turnstiles using the Suica IC Card system came into operation from November 18, 2001.

Passenger statistics
In fiscal 2019, the station was used by an average of 2,077 passengers daily (boarding passengers only).

The passenger figures (boarding passengers only) for previous years are as shown below.

Surrounding area
former Sagamiko Town Hall
Sagamiko Post Office
 Lake Sagami

See also
List of railway stations in Japan

References

External links

Official home page.

Railway stations in Japan opened in 1901
Railway stations in Sagamihara
Chūō Main Line
Stations of East Japan Railway Company
Railway stations in Kanagawa Prefecture